Indian Cardamom Research Institute(ICRI) is the only research station under Kerala Agricultural University dedicated to Cardamom. Started in 1956 and came under KAU in 1972. It is situated in Pampadumpara, Idukki.

References

External links
Official website

Agricultural research stations in Kerala
Idukki district
1956 establishments in Kerala
Research institutes established in 1956